The Markham Ice Shelf was one of five major ice shelves in Canada, all on the north coast of Ellesmere Island, Nunavut. The ice shelf broke off from the coast in early August 2008, becoming adrift in the Arctic Ocean. The 4,500-year-old ice shelf was then  in size, nearly the size of Manhattan, and approximately ten stories tall. On September 3, 2008, CNN quoted Derek Mueller, of Trent University in Ontario, Canada as saying to the Associated Press:

According to images from NASA, the ice shelf completely disintegrated over a period of 6 days in August 2008. By 2015, it had completely melted.

The ice shelf was named for Albert Hastings Markham, a British Arctic explorer.

Further reading
 Vincent, W. F., Mueller, D. R., & Bonilla, S. (2004). Ecosystems on ice: the microbial ecology of Markham Ice Shelf in the high Arctic. CRYOBIOLOGY. 48 (2), 103–112. OCLC 195074993

References 

Ellesmere Island
Ice shelves of Qikiqtaaluk Region